Big Brother All-Stars was the first season of the all-star spin-off of Big Brother and the tenth season of the Big Brother format in Bulgaria overall and featured housemates from previous seasons of the show, as well as from other reality formats such as Music Idol, Survivor and X Factor. The all-star edition commenced on 19 November 2012 on Nova Television right after the fourth-season finale of VIP Brother and lasted for a total of 29 days, ended on 17 December 2012. Together with VIP Brother 1 it holds the record for shortest season of the format in Bulgaria so far. Nikola Nasteski "Lester" won with Nayden Naydenov "Ned" as the runner-up.

As in the first two seasons of VIP Brother, nominations and evictions took place twice a week. The winner, Nikola, received a car.

Production

Pre-season
On 27 March 2012, Endemol announced that a deal with Nova TV had been finalized for another two seasons of the show to be aired. On 10 June 2012, Nova TV confirmed that VIP Brother 4 would commence in September and that an all-star edition of Big Brother would be aired directly after the finale at the end of 2012.

Logo
The official logo used was the same as the one for the thirteenth UK series. This logo was also used in the previous season, VIP Brother 4.

Housemates
10 housemates entered the house on Day 1, including the triplets.

Aleksandra
Aleksandra Apostolova "Sanny Alexa" was a contestant from X Factor 1 where she finished third. She entered the house on Day 1 and was the first evicted on Day 8.

Borislav
Borislav Borisov was a contestant from Big Brother 3. He entered the house on Day 1 and finished third in the finale on Day 29.

Cece
Cece Oreshkova was a contestant from the Macedonian reality show Fashion Stage. She is from Negotino, Macedonia and entered the house on Day 1 and was the sixth evicted on Day 27.

Dimitar
Dimitar Kazalov "Dimi" was a contestant from Big Brother 1. He entered the house on Day 1 and walked on Day 20.

Lilyana
Lilyana Angelova was a contestant from Big Brother 3 where she finished third. She entered the house on Day 1 and was the fifth evicted on Day 24.

Miroslav
Miroslav Atanasov was a contestant from Big Brother 2 where he won. He entered the house on Day 1 and was the fourth evicted on Day 24.

Nayden
Nayden Naydenov "Ned" was a contestant from Big Brother 1 and VIP Dance. He entered the house on Day 1 and finished  second in the finale on Day 29.

Nikola
Nikola Nasteski "Lester" was a contestant in the former Yugoslavian regional edition of the format called Veliki Brat 4. He is Model/Stripper from Skopje and entered the house on Day 1 and became a winner on Day 29.

Panayot
Panayot Kyuchukov "Patso" was a contestant from Big Brother 3. He entered the house on Day 1. He faced a fake eviction on Day 3 when he entered the Secret Room. Panayot returned to the house on Day 8, but was the second evicted on Day 15.

Stoyka
Stoyka Stefanova was a contestant from Big Brother 1. She entered the house on Day 1 and finished fourth in the finale on Day 29.

The Triplets 
On October 22, 2012 it was announced that the triplets from Big Brother 3 would return to participate in this season. Lyubov is the winner of the third season. Vyara, Nadezhda, and Lyubov (known collectively as 'The Triplets') were the third evicted on Day 22 with 83.5% of the votes to evict; Elena from Big Brother 2 is the only housemate so far in the history of the Big Brother format in Bulgaria to receive a higher percentage of votes to evict.

Houseguests

Stoyan
Stoyan Dudov was a fan of the show who was chosen by the viewers to enter the house, as announced before the beginning of the season. He entered the house as a houseguest on Day 10 and left on Day 15.

Nominations table

Notes

References

2012 Bulgarian television seasons
Big Brother (Bulgarian TV series) seasons
2012 Bulgarian television series debuts
2012 Bulgarian television series endings